Lansing is the capital of the U.S. state of Michigan. It is mostly in Ingham County, although portions of the city extend west into Eaton County and north into Clinton County. The 2020 census placed the city's population at 112,644, making it the sixth largest city in Michigan. The population of its metropolitan statistical area (MSA) was 541,297 at the 2020 census, the third largest in the state after metropolitan Detroit and Grand Rapids. It was named the new state capital of Michigan in 1847, ten years after Michigan became a state.

The Lansing metropolitan area, colloquially referred to as "Mid-Michigan", is an important center for educational, cultural, governmental, commercial, and industrial functions. Neighboring East Lansing is home to Michigan State University, a public research university with an enrollment of more than 50,000. The area features two medical schools, one veterinary school, two nursing schools, and two law schools. It is the site of the Michigan State Capitol, the state Supreme Court, the Court of Appeals, a federal court, the Library of Michigan and Historical Center, and headquarters of four national insurance companies.

Lansing is the only U.S. state capital (among the 47 located in counties) that is not also a county seat. The seat of government of Ingham County is Mason, but the county maintains some offices in Lansing.

History
The first recorded person of European descent to travel through the area that is now Lansing was British fur trader Hugh Heward and his French-Canadian team on April 24, 1790, while canoeing the Grand River. The land that was to become Lansing was surveyed as "Township 4 North Range 2 West" in February 1827 in what was then dense forest. It was the last of the county's townships to be surveyed, and the land was not offered for sale until October 1830. There would be no roads to this area for decades to come.

In the winter of 1835 and early 1836, two brothers from New York plotted the area now known as REO Town just south of downtown Lansing and named it "Biddle City". This land lay in a floodplain and was underwater during the majority of the year. Nevertheless, the brothers went back to Lansing, New York, to sell plots for the town that did not exist. They told the New Yorkers this new "city" had an area of 65 blocks, a church and a public and academic square. 16 men bought plots in the nonexistent city, and upon reaching the area later that year found they had been scammed. Many in the group, too disappointed to stay, ended up settling around what is now metropolitan Lansing.

The settlement of fewer than 20 people would remain dormant until the winter of 1847 when the state constitution required the capital be moved from Detroit to a more central and safer location in the state's interior; many were concerned about Detroit's proximity to British-controlled Canada, which had captured Detroit in the War of 1812. The United States had recaptured the city in 1813, but these events led to the dire need to have the center of government relocate away from hostile British territory. There was also concern with Detroit's strong influence over Michigan politics, being the state's largest city as well as the capital city.

During the multi-day session to determine a new location for the state capital, many cities, including Ann Arbor, Marshall, and Jackson, lobbied hard to win this designation. Unable to publicly reach a consensus because of constant political wrangling, the Michigan House of Representatives privately chose the Township of Lansing out of frustration. When announced, many present openly laughed that such an insignificant settlement was now Michigan's capital. Two months later, Governor William L. Greenly signed into law the act of the legislature making Lansing Township the state capital.

With the announcement that Lansing Township had been made the capital, the small village quickly transformed into the seat of state government. Within months after it became the capital city, individual settlements began to develop along three key points along the Grand River in the township:

 "Lower Village/Town", where present-day Old Town stands, was the oldest of the three villages. It was home to the first house built in Lansing in 1843 by pioneer James Seymour and his family. Lower Town began to develop in 1847 with the completion of the Franklin Avenue (now Grand River Avenue) covered bridge over the Grand River.
 "Upper Village/Town", where present-day REO Town stands at the confluence of the Grand River and the Red Cedar River. It began to take off in 1847 when the Main Street Bridge was constructed over the Grand River. This village's focal point was the Benton House, a 4-story hotel, which opened in 1848. It was the first brick building in Lansing and was later razed in 1900.
 "Middle Village/Town", where downtown Lansing now stands, was the last of the three villages to develop in 1848 with the completion of the Michigan Avenue bridge across the Grand River and the completion of the temporary capitol building which sat where Cooley Law School stands today on Capitol Avenue between Allegan and Washtenaw Streets, and finally the relocation of the post office to the village in 1851. This area would grow to become larger than the other two villages up and down river.

The collection of original settlements ("Upper Town", "Lower Town" and "Middle Town") had for some years been collectively referred to as the "Village of Michigan". On February 16, 1842, Alaiedon township was split into the townships of Lansing, Delhi and Meridian (originally suggested as "Genoa") based on a petition submitted in December 1841 by Henry North, Roswell Everett and Zalmon Holmes. Henry North proposed the name "Lansing" for the township at the request of his father, who wanted it named after their old town of Lansing, New York.

The boundaries of the original city were Douglas Avenue to the north, Wood and Regent streets to the east, Mount Hope Avenue to the south, and Jenison Avenue to the west. These boundaries would remain until 1916. Lansing began to grow steadily over the next two decades with the completion of the railroads through the city, a plank road, and the completion of the current capitol building in 1878.

Most of what is known as Lansing today is the result of the city becoming an industrial powerhouse which began with the founding of Olds Motor Vehicle Company in August 1897. The company went through many changes, including a buyout, between its founding to 1905 when founder Ransom E. Olds started his new REO Motor Car Company, which would last in Lansing for another 70 years. Olds would be joined by the less successful Clarkmobile around 1903. Over the next decades, the city would be transformed into a major American industrial center for the manufacturing of automobiles and parts, among other industries. The city also continued to grow in area.

Today, the city's economy is diversified among government service, healthcare, manufacturing, insurance, banking, and education.

Notable events

Anti-slavery movement
In the late 1840s to early 1850s, the citizens of Lansing were unified against slavery, and the city became a secondary stop on the Underground Railroad, as one of the last steps of an escape route that led through Battle Creek, Schoolcraft and Cassopolis. From Lansing, the route led to Durand, and then to either Port Huron or Detroit.

Major fires
The Kerns Hotel fire on December 11, 1934, was the deadliest in the city's history. Perhaps thirty-four people died in the fire, although the hotel register was also destroyed making an exact count impossible.

On February 8, 1951, the Elliott-Larsen Building was intentionally set on fire by a state office employee. The following morning, the seventh floor collapsed down to the next level, which destroyed a large number of state historical records.

Elephant incident
On September 26, 1963, a 12-year-old, 3,000-pound female dancing elephant named Rajje (alternately reported as Raji and Little Rajjee, among other variations) rebelled against her trainer during a performance in a shopping-center circus near what was then Logan Street and Holmes Road in Lansing, and escaped into the streets, aggravated by the frenzied pursuit of nearly 4,000 local residents. The incident ended with the shooting of the elephant by Lansing police. Provoked by the growing crowd, Rajje's rampage took her through the men's wear, sporting goods and gift departments of a local Arlan's discount store before leading police on a two-mile chase in which she knocked down and injured a 67-year-old man, tried to move a car, and caused thousands of dollars in damage before being killed.

Life Magazine quoted Rajje's trainer, William Pratt, as shouting at the scene, "Damn these people [...] They wouldn't leave her alone."

The incident was widely reported, including a photospread in Life. While the Lansing State Journal coverage stressed the danger of the incident, the Detroit Free Press noted that witnesses cried out "Murderers! Murderers!" as police fired eight shots.

Author Nelson Algren cites the injustice and sad end of the pursuit of "Raji, the Pixie-Eared Elephant" in continuity with the ambush of Bonnie Parker and Clyde Barrow in his introduction to a 1968 biography of the outlaws. Then teenage Lansing residents who had goaded the elephant later on recalled the incident with sober regret in a local newspaper retrospective in 2011.

Geography
Lansing is the centerpiece of a region of Michigan known as Mid-Michigan.

This figure includes two 425 Agreements with Alaiedon Township and Meridian Township, and the four 425 Agreements with Delta Township since 2000.

Since the 2010 census, the city has entered into two additional 425 Agreements. The first agreement consisted of the temporary transfer of 1,888.2 acres of Lansing Capital Region International Airport to the city from DeWitt Township in 2011.

Under Michigan law, 425 Agreements are only temporary land sharing agreements and do not count as official annexations. The Census Bureau, however, for statistical purposes does count these as annexations. Not counting the temporary 425 Agreements, Lansing administers  total.

Lansing is located in the south-central part of the Lower Peninsula of Michigan, where the Grand River meets the Red Cedar River. The city occupies most of what had formerly been part of Lansing Charter Township. It has also annexed adjacent tracts of land in Delta Charter Township and Windsor Township in Eaton County to the west, Delhi Charter Township in Ingham County to the south, and in DeWitt Charter Township in Clinton County to the north. The city also controls three non-contiguous tracts of land through 425 Agreements (conditional land transfer agreements) with Meridian Charter Township, Delta Charter Township, and Alaiedon Township in Ingham County to the southeast.

The Grand River, the largest river in Michigan, flows through downtown Lansing, and the Red Cedar River, a tributary of the Grand, flows through the campus of Michigan State University to its confluence with the Grand in Lansing. Sycamore Creek, a tributary of the Red Cedar, flows northward through the southeastern part of the city. There are two lakes in the area, Park Lake and Lake Lansing, both northeast of the city. Michigan State University Sailing Club and the Lansing Sailing Club are located on Lake Lansing, where sailing regattas are hosted throughout the summer.

All together then,  of the city (or approximately 10%) is publicly administered open space.

Climate
Lansing has a Midwestern humid continental climate (Köppen Dfb/Dfa) that is influenced by the Great Lakes, and is part of USDA Hardiness zone 5b. Winters are cold with moderate to heavy snowfall, while summers are very warm and humid. On average, temperatures reach or exceed  on 8.8 days of the year and drop to or below  on 10.5 nights. Precipitation is generally greatest during summer but still frequent and significant in winter. Freezing temperatures in June are exceedingly rare and have not occurred in July or August since the 19th century; on average, they arrive on October 4 and depart on May 7, allowing a growing season of 149 days. The average window for measurable snow (≥) is November 4 through April 6.

Neighborhoods

The city's downtown is dominated by state government buildings, especially the State Capitol; but downtown has also experienced recent growth in new restaurants, retail stores and residential developments. Downtown Lansing had a historic city market that was one of the oldest continuously operating farmers' markets in the United States, until it closed in 2019. Downriver and north of downtown is historic Old Town Lansing with many architecturally significant buildings dating to the mid-19th century. Directly south of downtown on the other side of I-496 along Washington Avenue lies "REO Town", the birthplace of the automobile in the United States, is where Ransom Eli Olds built factories along Washington Avenue. Ransom Eli Olds' home, which once overlooked the factories along Washington Avenue, was displaced by I-496.

Lansing is generally divided into four sections: the Eastside, Westside, Northwestside, and Southside. Each section contains a diverse array of neighborhoods. The Eastside, located east of the Grand River and north of the Red Cedar River, is the most ethnically diverse side of Lansing, with foreign-born citizens making up more of its population than any other side in the city. The Eastside's commercial districts are located mainly along Michigan Avenue, and to a lesser extent along Kalamazoo Street. It is anchored by Frandor Shopping Center on the very eastern edge of the eastside.

The Westside, roughly located north, west, and south of the Grand River as it curves through the city, is sometimes regarded as the city's most socio-economically diverse section. This side also contains Lansing's downtown area, though this neighborhood is often included as an area all its own. Outside downtown, this side is largely a collection of residential neighborhoods and is served by only one other commercial area along Saginaw Street. However, it also includes a small part of the Old Town Commercial Association.

The Northwestside, generally located north of the Grand River, with the city limits defining its north and western borders, is physically the smallest side of the city. This part of the city includes moderate-density residential areas and some green areas. North of Grand River Avenue, the main street of the side, lie warehouses and light industrial areas served by a major rail line that runs through Lansing. The most notable landmark of this side is Lansing's airport: Capital Region International Airport.

The Southside, usually described as the neighborhoods located south of the Grand and Red Cedar rivers and the I-496 freeway, is physically the largest and most populous side of the city. The area is largely residential in nature (south of Mount Hope Road near the northern edge) and is served by numerous commercial strips along Cedar Street, Martin Luther King Jr. Boulevard, Pennsylvania Avenue, and Waverly Road, which run north–south. The large Edgewood District is located in the southernmost part of the Southside and is sometimes referred to as South Lansing. Though it is the largest area of the city by both physical size and population, it has often been regarded by Southside citizens as Lansing's most overlooked and forgotten area, as most of Lansing's attention in recent decades has been put into the revitalization of the city's historic core located mostly on small parts of both the East and Westside.

The middle of the Southside—South-Central Lansing—contains the Old Everett Area. This location once contained the Everett School District and was annexed into the city in 1948.

Unincorporated areas adjacent to Lansing include parts of Lansing Charter Township, such as the unincorporated community of Edgemont Park, as well as parts of Delta Charter Township, such as the unincorporated community of Waverly. Though they are not part of the City of Lansing, these unincorporated communities often use Lansing mailing addresses.

Districts
 Cherry Hill
 Churchill Downs
 Colonial Village
 Eastside
 Edgewood
 Genesee
 Gier Park
 Hosmer
 Lansing-Eaton
 Moores Park
 Museum District
 Old Everett
 Old Town
 REO Town
 Stadium District
 Walnut
 Washington Square
 Westside

Demographics

2020 census

2010 census
As of the 2010 census, there were 114,297 people, 48,450 households, and 26,234 families residing in the city. The racial makeup of the city was 61.2% White (55.5% non-Hispanic White), 23.7% African American, 0.8% Native American, 3.7% Asian, 0.04% Pacific Islander, 4.3% from other races, and 6.2% from two or more races. Hispanic or Latino of any race were 12.5% of the population. Foreign-born residents made up 8.3% of the population.

The median age in the city was 32.2 years. 24.2% of residents were under the age of 18; 12.3% were between the ages of 18 and 24; 30.2% were from 25 to 44; 23.8% were from 45 to 64; and 9.7% were 65 years of age or older. The gender makeup of the city was 48.4% male and 51.6% female.

2000 census
As of the 2000 census, there were 119,128 people, 49,505 households, and 28,366 families residing in the city. The racial makeup of the city was 65.28% White (61.4% non-Hispanic White), 21.91% African American, 0.80% Native American, 2.83% Asian, 0.05% Pacific Islander, 4.54% from other races, and 4.60% from two or more races. Hispanic or Latino of any race were 10.0% of the population. The city's foreign-born population stood at 5.9%.

As of 2000, the city's population rose by 32,293 (27%) to 151,421 during the day due to the influx of workers.

There were 49,505 households, out of which 30.0% had children under the age of 18 living with them, 35.8% were married couples living together, 17.0% had a female householder with no husband present, and 42.7% were non-families. 33.2% of all households were made up of individuals, and 8.1% had someone living alone who was 65  years of age or older. The average household size was 2.39 and the average family size was 3.08.

In the city, the population was spread out, with 26.8% under the age of 18, 11.4% from 18 to 24, 32.7% from 25 to 44, 19.3% from 45 to 64, and 9.7% who were 65  years of age or older. The median age was 31  years. For every 100 females, there were 92.3 males. For every 100 females age 18 and over, there were 87.9 males.

The median income for a household in the city was $34,833, and the median income for a family was $41,283. Males had a median income of $32,648 versus $27,051 for females. The per capita income for the city was $17,924. About 13.2% of families and 16.9% of the population were below the poverty line, including 23.2% of those under age 18 and 9.0% of those age 65 or over.

Immigration and refugee resettlement
The Brookings Institution has ranked Greater Lansing among the top 10 "medium-sized metropolitan areas" in the United States for refugee resettlement, with 5,369 refugees resettled from 1983 to 2004. St. Vincent Catholic Charities and Lutheran Social Services handle the adult and unaccompanied minor resettlement processes, respectively, while other organizations, such as the Refugee Development Center, focus on providing educational and social support services to refugees in the Lansing area. Nearby Michigan State University provides a source of volunteers for many of these programs.

, the Lansing area has about 2,000 Arab Americans, mostly second-generation Christian Lebanese Americans as well as some Palestinian Americans.

The city is also home to a large number of temporary foreign residents enrolled as international students at Lansing Community College and nearby Michigan State University, with the city's visitors bureau specifically promoting Mandarin-language video tours of Lansing, touting the "more than 6,000" Chinese students enrolled at MSU. The Lansing School District offers language immersion programs for its students in both Spanish and Chinese.

Government

Lansing is administered under a mayor–council government, more specifically a strong mayor form in which the mayor is the city's chief executive officer. The mayor is obligated to appoint department heads (subject to council approval), and draft and administer a city budget among other responsibilities. The mayor may also veto legislation from council, though the veto can be overridden by an affirmative vote of two-thirds of the council. The mayor and city clerk are elected at-large every four years.

The city council is the legislative body of the city and consists of eight members. Four members are elected from four single-member districts using the first-past-the-post method in the city's wards, and four members are elected at-large using the block voting method. Members of the council serve staggered four-year terms. Half the council is up for election every two years, including two ward seats and two at-large seats. At its first meeting of the year, the council chooses from amongst its members a president and vice president. The president is the council's presiding officer, and also chooses the chairs of council committees. In the absence of the president and vice president, the city clerk chairs the council.

The city largely supports the Democratic Party. It has not had a Republican mayor in office since 1993 when then-Democratic state representative David Hollister defeated incumbent Mayor Jim Crawford, who had formerly served as a Republican member on the Ingham County Board of Commissioners. However, all city elections are held on an officially nonpartisan basis.

Since given the ability to do so by the state in 1964, the city has levied an income tax of 1 percent on residents. 0.5 percent on non-residents, and 1.0 percent on corporations.

State and federal representation
Lansing is currently split between three congressional districts. Most of the city lies within the boundaries of Michigan's 8th congressional district, which is represented by Democratic congresswoman Elissa Slotkin, who was elected in the 2018 midterm election. The small portion of the city that extends into Eaton County is located in the 7th district, which has been represented by Republican congressman Tim Walberg since 2011. The small portion of the city that extends into Clinton County is located in the 4th district, which has been represented by Republican congressman John Moolenaar since 2015.

At the state level, most of Lansing is located in the 23rd district of the Michigan Senate, which has been represented by Democratic state senator Curtis Hertel Jr. since 2015. The small portions of the city that extend into Eaton County and Clinton County is located in the 24th district of the Michigan Senate, are currently represented by Republican state senator Tom Barrett. The city lies in the 67th, 68th, 71st, and 93rd districts of the Michigan State House of Representatives, represented by state representatives Kara Hope (D-67), Sarah Anthony (D-68), Angela Witwer (D-71), and Graham Filler (R-93).

Though Lansing is not the designated county seat, some Ingham County offices are located in downtown Lansing, including a branch office of the county clerk, the county personnel office, and some courtrooms.

Economy

The Lansing metropolitan area's major industries are government, education, insurance, healthcare, and automobile manufacturing. Being the state capital, many state government workers reside in the area.

Michigan State University, Thomas M. Cooley Law School, and Lansing Community College are significant employers in the region.

General Motors has offices and a hi-tech manufacturing facility in Lansing and several manufacturing facilities immediately outside the city, as well, in nearby Lansing and Delta townships. The Lansing area is headquarters to four major national insurance companies: Auto-Owners Insurance Company, Jackson National Life, the Accident Fund, and Michigan Millers Insurance Company. Other insurers based in Lansing include Farm Bureau Insurance of Michigan.

Locally owned and operated convenience store chain Quality Dairy is a significant presence in the Lansing market.

The recent decline of the auto industry in the region has increased the region's awareness of the importance of a strategy to foster the high-technology sector.

Early availability of high-speed Internet in 1996, as well as the MSU, Cooley Law School, and Lansing Community College student body population, fostered an intellectual environment for information technology companies to incubate. Lansing has a number of technology companies in the fields of information technology and biotechnology.

Healthcare
Sparrow Hospital is a 740-bed hospital affiliated with Michigan State University and its College of Human Medicine and College of Osteopathic Medicine. It offers a Level I Trauma Center and its own helicopter service.

McLaren–Greater Lansing Hospital enjoys a special affiliation in radiation oncology with the University of Michigan and Michigan State University; McLaren–Greater Lansing is part of the Great Lakes Cancer Institute (GLCI).

Urban renewal and downtown redevelopment
Several urban renewal projects by private developers are adding higher end apartments and condominiums to the Lansing market. The Arbaugh, a former department store across from Cooley Law School, was converted into apartments in 2005. Motor Wheel Lofts, a former industrial site, was converted into loft-style living spaces in mid-2006. A combination retail and residential complex immediately south of Cooley Law School Stadium (formerly Oldsmobile Park) called "The Stadium District", was completed in 2007. The Stadium District was redeveloped using a grant from the Michigan State Housing Development Authority through the Cool Cities Initiative.

In May 2006 the historically significant Mutual Building located on Capitol Avenue was purchased by The Christman Company to be renovated back to its original grandeur and used as the company's headquarters. Additional downtown developments include the renovation of the historic Hollister Building and the expansion of the former Abrams Aerial Building. As of August 2008, an 18-story condominium high-rise called Capitol Club Tower was in the design phase with the adjacent parking structure having been approved by city council and purchased by the developer. The city market, in existence since 1909, was approved to be sold for a multi-building mixed-use development called MarketPlace, right next to the current market on the adjacent riverfront. The MarketPlace project was redeveloped along with BallPark North, another mixed-use development that will be immediately north of Oldsmobile Stadium. A new city market was built north of the Lansing Center, but closed in 2019. Across the river, the Accident Fund Insurance Company renovated the former (art deco) Ottawa Street Powerplant into their new headquarters. In addition to the renovation, Accident Fund Insurance Company built a modern addition to the north of the historic portion that is connected by an atrium for more office space, as well as a parking structure. In 2009, the restaurant Troppo began construction on a new 2-story building that will have an open-air patio on the roof facing the Capitol building. Developer Eyde Co. announced plans on April 6, 2010, to renovate the historical and prominent Knapp's building in downtown Lansing for first floor retail, office space and apartments/condos on the top floor (5th) in a $22–24 million project.

Retail
The Lansing area has two major malls: Lansing Mall and Meridian Mall. Other major retail centers include Eastwood Towne Center and Frandor Shopping Center.

Education

Michigan State University, a member of the Big Ten Conference, is known as "the pioneer land grant college", located in neighboring East Lansing. MSU has one of the largest land campuses in the United States and is home to several nationally and internationally recognized academic and research-oriented programs. Michigan State offers over 200 programs of study and is home to fourteen different degree-granting schools and colleges including two medical schools, a veterinary school, a law school, and numerous PhD programs. It is the only university in the nation with three medical schools. MSU is consistently one of the top three programs in the United States for study abroad programs. The MSU College of Education is also consistently rated as the top education program in the nation. Michigan State University is the oldest agricultural college in the United States. The MSU School of Criminal Justice is the oldest continuous degree granting criminal justice program in the nation. In 2008, the Department of Energy announced MSU won the contest for a $550 million Facility for Rare Isotope Beams that will attract top researchers from around the world to conduct experiments in nuclear science, astrophysics and applications of isotopes to other fields.

The Thomas M. Cooley Law School is the largest law school in the nation and is located in downtown Lansing. Cooley is fully accredited by the American Bar Association. A majority of Cooley students are from out-of-state.

Lansing Community College offers more than 500 areas of study to over 18,000 students at its main facilities in Lansing, and another 5,000 students at twenty-nine extension centers and a site in Otsu, Japan. LCC's new, state-of-the-art University Center enables students to take courses with the goal of eventually earning an undergraduate or graduate degree from other Michigan institutions. The University Center stands on the former site of "Old Central", Lansing's first public high school, which was established in 1875 as Lansing High School. (In the 1920s it was renamed as Central High School, and in 1957 became the first building on the LCC campus.)

Other institutions of higher education include Western Michigan University (branch campus in Delta Township), Davenport University in Downtown Lansing, Central Michigan University (branch campus), and Great Lakes Christian College (campus in Delta Township).

Schools

Boundary
Within Ingham County, most of Lansing is in Lansing School District. Some portions are in East Lansing School District, Holt Public Schools, Mason Public Schools, Okemos Public Schools, and Waverly Community Schools.

Within Clinton County, school districts which include parts of Lansing are Lansing School District and DeWitt Public Schools.

In Eaton County, school districts serving parts of Lansing include Lansing School District, Holt Public Schools, and Grand Ledge Public Schools.

Public schools
 Lansing School District
Lansing Eastern High School
Lansing Everett High School
J. W. Sexton High School
Grand Ledge Public Schools
 Ingham Intermediate School District
 Ingham Academy High School
Waverly School District

Charter schools
Mid-Michigan Public School Academy
 El-Hajj Malik El-Shabazz Academy (named after Malcolm X) (closed)
 Sankofa Shule (closed)

Private schools
Capitol City Baptist School
Emanuel Lutheran School
Lansing Catholic High School
Lansing Christian Schools
New Covenant Christian School
Our Savior Lutheran School

Cultural celebrations

Parades
The African American Parade occurs in Lansing's Westside as part of the annual Juneteenth Celebration

Each year in August, the Michigan Pride festival includes an LGBT pride parade from Riverfront Park to the capitol.

The annual Silver Bells in the City Electric Light Parade proceeds through the streets of downtown Lansing every November, the Friday before Thanksgiving. It is followed by the lighting of Michigan's official Christmas tree in front of the State Capitol and a firework show (weather permitting) over the State Capitol.

Music
The Lansing Symphony Orchestra has been entertaining generations of Lansing-area residents since 1929. The current music director is Timothy Muffett.

The Lansing JazzFest and the Old Town BluesFest host leading musicians, and are two of the larger music festivals held each year in the state.

Old Town's Festival of the Moon and Sun is a two-day festival of food and live music.

Old Town Oktoberfest is a two-day event drawing hundreds to the Old Town neighborhood for live polka music, authentic German food and world-renowned German-style beer.

It was announced in May 2007 that the city would host "Blues on the Square", a series of summertime blues concerts featuring national acts Thursday nights along Washington Square in downtown Lansing. In 2008 the event regularly drew crowds over 500.

The Common Ground Festival is a musical event held over a week every July at the Adado Riverfront Park in downtown Lansing pulling in crowds over 90,000 for the week. It began in 2000 and replaced the Michigan Festival that was held in nearby East Lansing. It has a wide range of musical acts. In 2008 acts included Staind, Drowning Pool, Sammy Hagar, The Hard Lessons, Snoop Dogg, REO Speedwagon, Kellie Pickler, Seether and Trace Adkins. 2012 acts included The Flaming Lips, Man Man, Motion City Soundtrack, Joshua Davis, mewithoutyou, with local ensembles The Lansing Unionized Vaudeville Spectacle and Vandalay on the bill.

Every year City Pulse names the "Top Original Act" in the Top of the Town Awards. The 2010 winner was Eastside neighborhood native indie rock band Loune. The 2011 winner was pop punk act Frank and Earnest.

On June 23, 2018, REO Town hosted the Three Stacks Music Festival featuring Against Me!, Murder by Death, Pup, mewithoutyou, Screaming Females, Camp Cove, Petal, Oceanator, City Mouse, Worn Spirit, Stefanie Haapala, Ness Lake, and Secret Forte.

Other notable Lansing musicians include Tell Yo Mama, Root Doctor, Jen Sygit, James Gardin, The Further Adventures of Fat Boy and the Jive Turkeys, MSU Professors of Jazz, Joe Hertler and the Rainbow Seekers, Jahshua Smith, BLAT! Pack, Deacon Earl and Frontier Ruckus.

Points of interest

Farmers' markets

Lansing has several farmers' markets throughout the city in the summer months. These markets include the Allen Street Farmer's Market on the city's eastside, the Westside Farmers' Market, the Old Town Farmer's Market, and the South Lansing Farmer's Market.

Libraries
The Library of Michigan and Historical Center is a state library and research center. The library is one of the top five genealogical research facilities in the United States. The Capital Area District Library has 13 branches within Ingham County, some of these include the Main Library downtown, the Foster Library on the east side, and the South Lansing Library on the south side.

Museums
Lansing is home to a number of small, specialized museums:

The Impression 5 Science Center is a children's science center located in a historic wagon works factory on the Grand River.
 The Michigan Library and Historical Center contains one of the 10 largest genealogy collections in the nation, has a museum dedicated to Michigan's history among other attractions.
The Michigan Women's Hall of Fame is a museum dedicated to the historical accomplishments and achievements of Michigan women. The house is located directly south of downtown in the 1903-built Cooley-Haze House. The museum is surrounded by Cooley Gardens.
 The R. E. Olds Transportation Museum is dedicated to the education of Lansing's role in the development of transportation, particularly the automobile.
 The Turner-Dodge House is a museum dedicated to Lansing's early pioneers. The museum sits in the Classical Revival-styled Turner-Dodge Mansion, built in 1858 for James and Marion Turner, and later by their daughter and her husband. It is on the National Register of Historic Places.

Theatre
 The Riverwalk Theatre, (formerly the Okemos Barn Theatre), the Lansing Civic Players, and the now defunct BoarsHead Theater are or were all located in downtown.
 Peppermint Creek Theatre Company is a well established "new" theater company.
Happendance, Michigan's longest-running professional modern dance company, has been based in Greater Lansing since 1976.
The Greater Lansing Ballet Company is a ballet and dance company.
 The Creole Gallery brings in various musicians and hosts the Icarus Falling Theater group.

Potter Park Zoo

The historic Potter Park Zoo, located along the Red Cedar River in Lansing, is a 102-acre park that has more than 160 species of animals. The park holds numerous programs and events for children and families to enjoy. With annual attendance increasing every year since 2006 (110,167 in 2006, 137,237 in 2008, and 167,000 in 2009) there are $667,100 in capital improvements planned for 2009 including a giant walk-in aviary and a new female tiger. In 2009 the zoo began a $1.4 million renovation to its rhinoceros exhibit. This is in addition to $1.3 million spent on capital improvements in 2008. In 2011 the Black Rhino exhibit opened; and three tiger cubs were born. In 2016 a 3-acre moose exhibit opened in the park.

Other area destinations
Many Broadway shows come to The Wharton Center before traveling to theaters in larger places such as Chicago. The Kresge Art Museum, the MSU Museum, and the Abrams Planetarium are highly acclaimed cultural destinations located on the campus of Michigan State University in East Lansing. In June 2007 MSU announced the plans to build a new art museum after a $26 million gift from Eli and Edythe Broad. Internationally known Pritzker Prize winning architect Zaha Hadid of London won the design competition for the East Lansing museum that was completed in November 2012.

Media

Newspapers and magazines
 Lansing State Journal
 City Pulse
 The New Citizens Press
 Capital Gains Media
 Capital Area Women's Lifestyle Magazine
 The Greater Lansing Business Monthly
 Greater Lansing Woman Magazine
 The Hub
 MIRS News-Michigan Information & Research Service
 The State News
 Gongwer News Service
 The Michigan Bulletin
 Patient In Charge Magazine

Television
Cable slots listed reflect the Comcast cable system in Lansing.

 WLNS 6 (CBS) (Cable 9)
 WILX 10 (NBC) (Cable 4)
 WKAR 23 (PBS) (Cable 13) / DT2 (World) (Cable 20) / DT3 (Create) (Cable 18) / DT4 (PBS Kids) (Cable 293)
 WSYM 47 (Fox) (Cable 7)
 WLAJ 53 (ABC) (Cable 3) / DT2 (The CW) (Cable 5)

Radio
Note: If the station has no city listed before the format, it is licensed to Lansing.
 88.1 WLGH – (Leroy Township, contemporary Christian) "Smile FM"
 88.5 WJOM – (Eagle, contemporary Christian) "Smile FM"
 88.9 WDBM – (East Lansing, college/Michigan State University) "The Impact"
 89.7 WLNZ – (public radio/Lansing Community College)
 90.5 WKAR – (East Lansing, public radio/Michigan State University)
 Note: WKAR has an effective radiated power of 86,000 watts
 91.3 WOES – (Ovid, polka/Ovid-Elsie High School)
 92.1 WQTX – (St. Johns, sports talk) "The Team"
 92.9 WLMI – (Grand Ledge, CHR) "Lansing's New Hits"
 93.7 WBCT-FM – (Grand Rapids, country) "B93"
 Note: WBCT has an effective radiated power 320,000 watts
 94.1 WWDK – (Jackson, Classic Country) "94.1 Duke FM"
 94.9 WMMQ – (East Lansing, classic rock)
 96.5 WQHH – (DeWitt, urban) "Power 96.5"
 97.5 WJIM – (CHR) "97-5 Now-FM"
 99.1 WFMK – (East Lansing, adult contemporary)
 99.9 W260BX - (religious/southern gospel) "Family Life Radio" 
 Rebroadcasts WUNN 1110 AM. 
 100.7 WITL-FM – (country) "Whittle"
 101.7 WHZZ – (adult hits) "Mike-FM"
 105.7 WSRW – (Grand Rapids, adult contemporary) "Star 105.7"
 106.1 WJXQ – (Charlotte, active rock) "Q106"
 107.3 WTNR – (Greenville/Grand Rapids, Country)
 730 AM WVFN – (East Lansing, sports talk) "The Game"
 870 AM WKAR – (East Lansing, NPR news/talk)
 1110 AM WUNN – (Mason, religious/southern gospel) "Family Life Radio" 
 1180 AM WXLA – Dimondale, (adult standards) "Timeless Classics 1180"
 1240 AM WJIM – (news/talk) "Lansing's Big Talker"
 1320 AM WILS – (news/talk) "More Compelling Talk Radio"
 1390 AM WLCM – (Charlotte, religious)
 1580 AM WWSJ – (St. Johns, urban contemporary gospel) "Joy 1580"
 162.400 WXK81 – NOAA Weather Radio (Onondaga, weather)

Radio stations from Ann Arbor, Grand Rapids, Kalamazoo, Saginaw, and Flint can also be heard in the Lansing area.

Sports

The Lansing Lugnuts are a High-A Central league, Minor League Baseball team, currently affiliated with the Oakland A's. The team plays its home games at Jackson Field, which was built at a cost of $12.7 million and opened in 1996 in downtown Lansing. It was partially renovated in 2006. Jackson Field has a seating capacity of 11,215 fans, and was built to accommodate additional expansion. Previously known as Oldsmobile Park, the facility was renamed Thomas M. Cooley Law School Stadium in April 2010, in reference to the park's new sponsor. It was renamed again to Jackson Field after a change in sponsorship to Jackson National Life.

Michigan State University, located in East Lansing, is the largest university in the State of Michigan. MSU sponsors both men's and women's sports, usually competing as a member of the Big Ten Conference. The Spartans have won National Titles in Men's Basketball, Football, Men's Boxing, Men's Cross Country, Men's Gymnastics, Men's Ice Hockey, Men's Soccer, and Men's Wrestling.

Lansing Community College also sponsors many sports, competing as members of the Michigan Community College Athletic Association. The Stars have won NJCAA titles in the following sports: Women's Softball, Men's Basketball, Women's Basketball, Men's Cross Country, Women's Cross Country, Women's Marathon and Men's Marathon.

The Lansing area is also known for its many golf courses, with two courses owned by Michigan State University, four municipal courses, and many additional public and private courses in the area. The former Walnut Hills Country Club in nearby East Lansing formerly hosted the LPGA's Oldsmobile Classic from 1992 to 2000. The Michigan PGA recently relocated from the Detroit area to Bath, Michigan, which is on the northern edge of Lansing.

In the 1980s and 1990s Lansing was a major player in semi-pro football. The Lansing Crusaders won MFL/MCFL championships in 1982, 1983, 1985, 1987, 1989, and 1990. The team finished second in 1984, 1986, and 1991.

Other past sports teams include:
 Lansing – Michigan State League (baseball) – 1889 to 1890
 Lansing Senators – Michigan State League (baseball) – 1895 and 1902
 Southern Michigan League – 1907 to 1914
 Central League – 1921 to 1922
 renamed the Lansing Lancers – Michigan State League – 1940
 and then back as the Lansing Senators – Michigan State League – 1941
 Lansing Capitals – North American Basketball League – 1966–67 to 1967–68
 Lansing Lancers – International Hockey League – 1974 to 1975
 Capital City Cardinals – Michigan Charity Football League – 1980
 Lansing Crusaders – Michigan Charity Football League – 1980 to 1988
 Michigan Football League – 1989 to 1994
 Capital City Cowboys – Michigan Football League – 1992
 Capital City Stealth - Michigan Minor League Football - 2010-2019
 Lansing Ice Nuts – International Independent Hockey League – 2003 to 2004
 Lansing United – USL PDL – 2014 to 2018
 Lansing Ignite – USL League One – 2018 to 2019
 Lansing Sting - American Basketball Association - 2013 to 2014
 Lansing Hot Rods - Continental Indoor Lacrosse League - 2013-

Transportation

Airports

Scheduled commercial airline service is offered from Capital Region International Airport (formerly known as Capital City Airport). Delta Air Lines maintains routes to Detroit and Minneapolis. United Airlines maintains routes to Chicago O'Hare. American Airlines offers non-stop flights to Washington, D.C., and Chicago O'Hare. Apple Vacations provides seasonal flights to Cancún, Mexico; Montego Bay, Jamaica; and Punta Cana, Dominican Republic. UPS has a freight hub at Capital Region International Airport making up part of the 42 million pounds of annual cargo moving through the airport. In 2008 the airport received a port of entry designation – known as Port Lansing – and now has a permanent customs facility, thus changing its name to reflect the port of entry status. The same year a  extension to the largest of the three runways – now  – was completed to allow for larger aircraft to use the airport.

Major highways
 runs from Indianapolis north to Lansing and east to Flint and Port Huron, connecting to Canada.
 runs from Muskegon, past Grand Rapids and Lansing, to Detroit.
 loops through downtown Lansing, connecting with I-96 on either end.
 is a loop route running through Lansing and East Lansing.
 is a loop route running through Lansing.
 a loop route off I-496 serving the state capitol and other downtown facilities.
 is a north–south highway passing between the city and neighboring East Lansing, continuing northerly toward Clare and Grayling and southerly toward Jackson, Michigan, and into Ohio.
 (Saginaw Street/Grand River Avenue)
 (Martin Luther King Jr. Boulevard)

Railways

 Amtrak provides intercity passenger rail service at a stop in nearby East Lansing, on the Blue Water line from Chicago to Port Huron.
 Three freight railroads serve Lansing including Canadian National Railway, CSX Transportation, and the Jackson & Lansing Railroad.

Public transportation
 Capital Area Transportation Authority (CATA) provides public transit bus service to the Lansing-East Lansing Metropolitan area on 33 routes. CATA boasts the second highest ridership in the state of Michigan after Detroit with 53,000 daily rides in September 2008 and 11,306,339 rides in fiscal year 2008. CATA also provides paratransit services through Spec-Tran and the "Night Owl." Also, the "Entertainment Express" (CATA route 4) runs Thursday through Saturday from 7 pm to 2 am connecting downtown Lansing's and East Lansing's entertainment districts. CATA won APTA's America's Best Transit Award in the medium-size category (4–30 million rides) in 2007. CATA has two transportation centers (CTC), one in downtown Lansing and one on the campus of Michigan State University. In 2010, a study was conducted to consider ways of enhancing the Lansing-to-East Lansing route (currently known as Route 1), with options including enhanced bus service, single-car trolley service and light rail service. (Heavy rail was eliminated as an option early in the process, with enhanced bus service eventually winning out.)
 Greyhound Lines provides inter-city bus service. CATA and Greyhound are both located in the CATA Transportation Center (CTC) in downtown Lansing.
 Several taxicab companies serve the area. In 2001, Big Daddy Taxi opened using large vans to address the safety concerns of drunk driving and offered $3 rides for students of Michigan State University. In 2008 the Green Cab Company opened using Toyota Prius hybrid cars to provide "green" cabs to Lansing.
 The Michigan Flyer provides bus service between Lansing and Detroit Metro Airport 12 times daily, with a stop in Ann Arbor along the way.

Bicycling
 The , non-motorized Lansing River Trail runs along the Grand River and the Red Cedar River, running as far east as Michigan State University, and passes Potter Park Zoo, the Capitol Loop, and several other destinations of interest, and as far west as Moores Park. The trail is accessible at many points along it, some with car parking lots. The trails breadth is extended from time to time. Currently, the trailheads are: North – Dietrich Park; East – Kircher Park; South – Maguire Park; West – Moores Park. All segments are hard-surfaced. The River Trail connects to other pathways/trails in the Lansing-metro area: East – Michigan State University path system; South – Sycamore Trail. Since the trail follows a river, most street crossings use platforms under existing street bridges to provide an uncommon amount of grade separation, to the benefit of both trail users and automobile traffic. As of February 2015, the River Trail is under construction to add paths as far as Holt.

Utilities
Water supply, power and steam are municipally owned utilities which are provided by Lansing Board of Water & Light. In 2008 the Lansing BWL constructed Michigan's largest solar array towards the goal of increasing renewable energy in the energy grid.

Natural gas is provided by Consumers Energy.

Notable people

 Joel Bakan, Canadian law professor and documentary filmmaker
 Ray Stannard Baker, journalist and author
 L. Anna Ballard, first female medical physician in Lansing, Michigan
 Terry Brunk, ex-WWE, ECW, TNA/WCW professional wrestler known as "Sabu"
 Timothy Busfield, actor and director, thirtysomething, Field of Dreams, The West Wing
 Ricky Berry, NBA player for Sacramento Kings
 Lingg Brewer, politician and educator
 Charles G. Callard, co-founder of Callard Madden & Associates and a pioneer developer of corporate valuation models
 Candi Carpenter, country singer & songwriter
 Jim Cash, screenwriter of Top Gun and other commercially successful films
 Carolyn Cassady, writer, wife of beat generation icon Neal Cassady
Alva M. Cummins, lawyer and 1922 Democratic nominee for Governor of Michigan
 Doc Corbin Dart, singer of punk band The Crucifucks
 DJ Infamous, hip-hop DJ
 Tony Earl, former Governor of Wisconsin
 Ed Emshwiller, visual artist and founder of CalArts computer animation Lab
 Rashad Evans, UFC fighter
 David Fairchild, botanist
 Ed Farhat, professional wrestler known as "The Sheik"
 Jonathan Farwell, actor
 Bryn Forbes, NBA basketball player
 Chris Hansen, Dateline NBC correspondent
 Thom Hartmann, radio talk-show host and author
 Ahney Her, actress, Gran Torino
 Joel Higgins, actor, graduated from Michigan State
 Andy Hilbert, NHL hockey player
 Keiffer Hubbell, figure skater
 Madison Hubbell, figure skater
 Steve Huffman, American entrepreneur and web developer, CEO and co-founder of Reddit
 John Hughes, film writer and director, born in Lansing
 Carol Hutchins, softball Hall of Famer
 Magic Johnson, Michigan State University and NBA basketball star
 Jacquelyn Kelley, All-American Girls Professional Baseball League player
 Michael Kimball, novelist
 Lisa Kron, theatre actress and playwright
 Matthew Lillard, actor
 Dean Look, football player and official
 Malcolm X, human rights activist
 Jef Mallett, creator and artist of the comic strip Frazz
 Suzanne Malveaux, CNN television news reporter
 Teal Marchande, actress 
 Todd Martin, tennis player
 Pop McKale, athlete and coach; University of Arizona arena bears his name
 Drew Miller, NHL hockey player
 Kelly Miller, NHL player
 Kip Miller, NHL player, 1990 recipient of Hobey Baker Memorial Award
 Ryan Miller, NHL and Olympic hockey player
 Muhsin Muhammad, NFL football player
 Needlz, hip-hop and rap producer
 Ransom E. Olds, automobile manufacturer, founded Olds Motor Vehicle Company
 Larry Page, co-founder of Google.com
 DJ Perry, film writer, actor and director, born in Lansing
 Wally Pipp, former Baseball player and member of the New York Yankees
 Alice Pollitt, All-American Girls Professional Baseball League player
 Corey Potter, NHL hockey player
 Merv Pregulman, NFL player for Green Bay Packers, Detroit Lions
 Dan Price, co-founder and CEO of Gravity Payments
 Greg Raymer, 2004 World Series of Poker champion
 Carl Benton Reid, actor
 Burt Reynolds, Oscar-nominated and Golden Globe award-winning actor, born and raised in Lansing
 Vic Saier, MLB player
 Steven Seagal, actor and martial artist, born in Lansing
 Frederic L. Smith, co-founder of General Motors, born in Lansing
 John Smoltz, MLB pitcher, 1996 Cy Young Award winner, Hall of Famer
 Lori Nelson Spielman, Author of the bestseller Life List 
 Debbie Stabenow, U.S. senator
 Gary Starkweather, Inventor of the laser printer
 Marcus Taylor, professional basketball player
 George Teague, NFL player for Green Bay Packers, Dallas Cowboys, Miami Dolphins
 Denzel Valentine, professional basketball player
 Jay Vincent, professional basketball player
 Sam Vincent, professional basketball player
 Gretchen Whitmer, Governor of Michigan and former Minority Leader of the Michigan State Senate
 Howard Wolpe, Congressman who was a Lansing resident during his term in office.
 Lebbeus Woods, architect.

International relations

Sister cities
Lansing's sister cities are:

 Akuapim South District, Eastern Region, Ghana
 Asan, Chungcheongnam-do, South Korea
 Guadalajara, Jalisco, Mexico
 Ōtsu, Shiga, Japan
 Pianezza, Piedmont, Italy
 Saltillo, Coahuila, Mexico
 Sanming, Fujian, China

Lansing was a sister city of Kubyashi District in Saint Petersburg, Russia. The agreement began in 1992 and ended in practice when a change to the political structure of Saint Petersburg cancelled the district. The relations were officially severed by Lansing in 2013 as a protest of the laws against LGBT rights in Russia.

Friendship cities
Lansing's friendship cities are:
 Cosenza, Calabria, Italy
 Dar es Salaam, Tanzania
 Sakaide, Kagawa, Japan

Notes

References

Further reading

  Available on NewsBank, Record Number: 33658e6f3e435749c466e59bf44dd1b692752.

External links

 City of Lansing official website
 Greater Lansing Convention & Visitors Bureau
 Great Lakes Capital Fund promotes affordable housing and community economic development activities in Lansing
 The Lansing Republican, excerpts from 1859 editions

 OpenStreetMap:Lansing, Michigan

 
Cities in Clinton County, Michigan
Cities in Eaton County, Michigan
Cities in Ingham County, Michigan

Populated places established in 1835
1835 establishments in Michigan Territory